The South Africa women's national cricket team toured the West Indies in January 2013. They played the West Indies in 5 One Day Internationals and 2 Twenty20 Internationals, drawing the ODI series 2–2 and losing the T20I series 2–0. The series preceded both teams' participation in the 2013 World Cup, held in India.

Squads

Tour Matches

50-over match: Saint Kitts Under-17 Boys v South Africa

50-over match: Saint Kitts Under-17 Boys v South Africa

WODI Series

1st ODI

2nd ODI

3rd ODI

4th ODI

5th ODI

WT20I Series

1st T20I

2nd T20I

References

External links
South Africa Women tour of West Indies 2012/13 from Cricinfo

South Africa women's national cricket team tours
Women's international cricket tours of the West Indies
International cricket competitions in 2013
2013 in women's cricket